Louis P. Masur (born 4 February 1957) is an American historian.

Masur is a Distinguished Professor of American Studies and History at Rutgers University. He is an elected member of the American Antiquarian Society, the Massachusetts Historical Society, and the Society of American Historians.

Bibliography 

Some of his books are:

 The Civil War: A Concise History  
 1831: Year of Eclipse 
 Runaway Dream: Born to Run and Bruce Springsteen's American Vision  
 The Soiling of Old Glory: The Story of a Photograph That Shocked America 
 Lincoln's Hundred Days: The Emancipation Proclamation and the War for the Union  
 Autumn Glory: Baseball's First World Series 
 Lincoln's Last Speech: Wartime Reconstruction and the Crisis of Reunion

References

External links
 
 

1957 births
Living people
21st-century American historians
21st-century American male writers
Rutgers University faculty
American male non-fiction writers